The Pinnacle Road–East Pinnacle Border Crossing connects the town of East Pinnacle, Quebec with the western portion of Richford, Vermont.  A new US border station at this crossing was built in 2012, directly behind the old border station.  For years, the old border station was heated using a solar water heating system.

The border crossing is one of the least busy in Vermont, with three to 20 cars using it a day. For many years, there were no border inspection services at this location.  Finally in 1971, the US built a border inspection station.  Canada built its border station in 1982, rerouting Chemin de la Frontiere around it. Both the US and Canadian border stations are open only from 8 AM to 4 PM, seven days a week.

See also
 List of Canada–United States border crossings

References

Canada–United States border crossings
Geography of Montérégie
Geography of Franklin County, Vermont
1976 establishments in Quebec
1976 establishments in Vermont